David Rutigliano (born July 14, 1965) is an American politician who has served in the Connecticut House of Representatives from the 123rd district since 2013.

References

1965 births
Living people
21st-century American politicians
Republican Party members of the Connecticut House of Representatives